"I Wanna Do It All" is a song written by Tim Nichols, Rick Giles and Gilles Godard, and recorded by Canadian country music artist Terri Clark.  It was released in August 2003 as the third single from her album Pain to Kill.  The song peaked at number 3 on Billboard's Hot Country Songs chart and reached number 38 on the Billboard Hot 100.

Content
Considered a women's anthem, the song finds Clark singing about all of the things she would do if she could get away.  Several versions of the song were recorded for broadcasting in different American cities, replacing the standard "see the Yankees play ball" lyrics with local baseball and/or football teams.  The Washington, DC version references the Washington Redskins NFL team, Baltimore's version references both the NFL Ravens and MLB Orioles, and Pittsburgh's version the NFL Steelers. Most New England area stations air "Watch the Pat's play ball!" in reference to the New England Patriots, while some of Boston/New England's local stations have reportedly played "Watch the Red Sox play ball!" in reference to the Boston Red Sox.  In Arizona, the song references the Arizona Diamondbacks baseball team with the lyric "Watch the D-backs play ball."

Critical reception
Deborah Evans Price, of Billboard magazine reviewed the song favorably, saying that the song is "marked by Clark's effervescent delivery and a well-written lyric that is instantly relatable." She adds that initially, Clark's performance "reverberates with the frustration often produced by the tedium of daily living, but when she romps into the chorus and unleashes her litany of hopes, dreams, and desires, the longing in her vocal is palpable." She concludes her review by saying that it is "one of those fee-good songs that is an immediate musical motivator sure to make listeners shake off their doldrums and reach for that brass ring-or perhaps the nearest shot of tequila."

Music video
A live music video was directed by Milton Lage and premiered in late 2003. The concert was taken from a various of CMT On Tour 2003 performances, and, therefore, the video was never broadcast on GAC.

Chart positions
"I Wanna Do It All" debuted at number 59 on the U.S. Billboard Hot Country Singles & Tracks for the week of August 30, 2003.

Year-end charts

References

2003 singles
2003 songs
Terri Clark songs
Songs written by Rick Giles
Songs written by Tim Nichols
Song recordings produced by Byron Gallimore
Song recordings produced by Keith Stegall
Mercury Records singles